Aslauga is a genus of butterflies in the family Lycaenidae. They are associated with other insects and found only in the Afrotropical realm. They are small usually grey-blue or grey-purple butterflies with a distinctive, but widely varied wing shape, especially pronounced in A. pandora. They are forest butterflies of the Congolian forests and Lower Guinean forests.

Original description by William Forsell Kirby:

"Wings short and broad, very densely scaled; anterior wings strongly curved outwards in the middle of the hind margin; posterior wings with a concavity on the inner margin at the anal angle. Anterior wings with the subcostal nervure five-branched, the first two branches emitted near together before the end of the cell and parallel, the other three short and emitted near the apex of the wing; the third and fourth parallel, running into the costa before the apex, the fifth running to the hind margin just below the apex".

Species
Aslauga abri Collins & Libert, 1997
Aslauga atrophifurca Cottrell, 1981
Aslauga aura Druce, 1913
Aslauga australis Cottrell, 1981
Aslauga bella Bethune-Baker, 1913
Aslauga bitjensis Bethune-Baker, 1925
Aslauga bouyeri Libert, 1994
Aslauga camerunica Stempffer, 1969
Aslauga confusa Libert, 1994
Aslauga ernesti (Karsch, 1895)
Aslauga febe (Libert, 1994)
Aslauga guineensis Collins & Libert, 1997
Aslauga imitans Libert, 1994
Aslauga kallimoides Schultze, 1912
Aslauga karamoja (Libert, 1994)
Aslauga katangana (Romieux, 1937)
Aslauga lamborni Bethune-Baker, 1914
Aslauga latifurca Cottrell, 1981
Aslauga marginalis Kirby, 1890
Aslauga marshalli Butler, 1898
Aslauga modesta Schultze, 1923
Aslauga orientalis Cottrell, 1981
Aslauga pandora Druce, 1913
Aslauga prouvosti Libert & Bouyer, 1997
Aslauga purpurascens Holland, 1890
Aslauga satyroides Libert, 1994
Aslauga tanga Libert & Collins, 1997
Aslauga vininga (Hewitson, 1875)

References

Libert, M. 1994. Contribution à l’étude des Lycaenidae africains: Mise au point sur le genre Aslauga Kirby. Lambillionea, 94 (3) : 411–434.

External links
Aslauga at Markku Savela's website on Lepidoptera
Seitz A. Die Gross-Schmetterlinge der Erde 13: Die Afrikanischen Tagfalter. Plate XIII 64
Images at BOLD
Fauna Africains Libert

 
Miletinae
Lycaenidae genera
Taxa named by William Forsell Kirby
Taxonomy articles created by Polbot